Kev's Back (The Return of the Yobbo) is the second album by the bawdy Australian singer/comedian Kevin Bloody Wilson. The album won the first ever ARIA Award for "Best Comedy Release" and was nominated for "Highest Selling Album".  The album includes what is claimed by critics to be overtly racist humour.

The song, "Living Next Door to Alan", is a parody of New World's "Living Next Door to Alice", and is about an indigenous family claiming land next door to millionaire Alan Bond.

Track listing
All tracks written by Dennis Bryant.

 "The Last Lager Waltz"
 "That's What He Really Said"
 "Kev's Courtin' Song"
 "Breathe Through My Ears"
 "Mick the Master Farter"
 "Living Next Door To Alan"
 "The Pubic Hair Song"
 "It Was Over" (Kev's Lament)
 "Dick'taphone"
 "Hey Santa Claus"

Charts

Weekly charts

Year-end charts

Certifications

References 

1985 albums
ARIA Award-winning albums
Kevin Bloody Wilson albums
1980s comedy albums